The Skuna River is a tributary of the Yalobusha River, about 75 mi (120 km) long, in north-central Mississippi in the United States.  Via the Yalobusha and Yazoo Rivers, it is part of the watershed of the Mississippi River.

Course
The Skuna River rises about 4 mi (6 km) west of Pontotoc in Pontotoc County and flows generally southwestwardly through Chickasaw and Calhoun Counties, past the town of Bruce.  Most of the river's course has been channelized, and it is also known as the "Skuna River Canal."  It joins the Yalobusha River 6 mi (9.7 km) east of Grenada, as the north arm of Grenada Lake, which is formed by a U.S. Army Corps of Engineers dam on the Yalobusha. 
The Skuna has an average annual discharge of 620 cubic feet per second at Coffeeville, MS.

Name
Skuna is a name derived from the Choctaw language purported to mean "entrails, guts".

The United States Board on Geographic Names settled on "Skuna River" as the stream's name on February 3, 1926.  According to the Geographic Names Information System, it has also been known as:
Loosa Schoona
Loosa Shooner Creek
Schoona
Schooner
Scoona Creek
Scoopa Creek 
Scuna
Shooner

See also
List of Mississippi rivers

References

External links
Grenada Lake

Sources
Columbia Gazetteer of North America entry
DeLorme (1998).  Mississippi Atlas & Gazetteer.  Yarmouth, Maine: DeLorme.  .

Rivers of Mississippi
Bodies of water of Calhoun County, Mississippi
Bodies of water of Chickasaw County, Mississippi
Bodies of water of Pontotoc County, Mississippi
Mississippi placenames of Native American origin